Thermo King is an American manufacturer of transport temperature control systems for refrigerator trucks and trailers, refrigerated containers and refrigerated railway cars along with heating, ventilation and air conditioning systems for bus and passenger rail applications. Headquartered in the Minneapolis suburb of Bloomington, Minnesota. Thermo King is a subsidiary of Trane Technologies.

History
Joseph A. "Joe" Numero sold his Cinema Supplies Inc. movie sound equipment business to RCA in 1938 and formed a new entity, the U.S. Thermo Control Company (later the Thermo King LLC), in partnership with his engineer, inventor Frederick McKinley Jones. Jones designed a portable air-cooling unit for trucks carrying perishable food, for which they had obtained a patent on July 12, 1940, subsequent to a challenge to invent a refrigerated truck over a golf game by associates of Numero's, Werner Transportation Co.'s President Harry Werner, and United States Air Conditioning Co.'s President Al Fineberg, resulting in the "Model A" and the founding of Thermo King.

The invention ushered in the era of frozen foods, large supermarkets, and the modern restaurant industry. Refrigerated transport made the delivery of fresh produce anywhere in the country a possibility, regardless of the season. The concept of continuous cooling of perishables is often referred to as the "Farm to Fork" cold chain. With mobile refrigeration compressors driven by fuel-powered engines and stationary refrigeration compressors driven by grid-sourced electricity, the food is kept cold from the point of production through to the point of distribution to consumers.

In 1942, Jones developed the first portable refrigeration units for troops stationed overseas in World War II. Thermo King also introduced the first gasoline-powered mechanical refrigerated boxcars in the 1940s, which reduced shipping costs, making fresh produce more widely available and affordable for the public. By 1949, annual revenues reached $3 million for the company.

With the introduction of diesel engines in refrigerated units in 1958, engine life would out-perform their gasoline-powered counterparts in terms of longevity. Thermo King was not limited to transport refrigeration products, however. Some of the additional products the company built and sold included milk coolers, golf carts, school desks and shopping carts.

On March 5, 1966, a group of 75 people associated with the company were among the 113 passengers and 11 crew members who died when BOAC Flight 911 crashed near Mount Fuji, Japan. Company executives and their top dealers were on a 14-day company sponsored tour of Japan and Southeast Asia, which was organized as a reward for sales performance. A company spokesman, quoted in the press in reaction to the tragedy, said that "this has got to be one of the worst things that a company can experience."

During the 1970s, Thermo King continued to manufacture equipment for the transportation industry. Their early efforts have evolved into a widely recognized line of products and Thermo King has becoming a worldwide business. Thermo King Europe opened in Galway, Ireland, and began producing refrigeration units to be sold throughout Europe, Africa, the Middle East, Australia and Asia. Their global expansion continues to this day.

In 1991, the National Medal of Technology was awarded to Joseph A. Numero and Frederick M. Jones. President George Bush presented the awards posthumously to their widows at a ceremony in the White House Rose Garden. Jones was the first African American to receive the award (see Frederick McKinley Jones).
 
In 1997, Ingersoll Rand acquired Thermo King from Westinghouse for $2.56 billion in cash, 13 times earnings, and added it to its Climate Control Technologies (later Climate Solutions) businesses, alongside Trane and Hussmann. At the time Thermo King controlled close to half the global market for refrigeration equipment.

References

External links 

Thermo King Model C in MNopedia, the Minnesota Encyclopedia 
Official website
Thermo King Europe
ThermoKare Service Solutions
Thermo King Turkey

Auto parts suppliers of the United States
Heating, ventilation, and air conditioning companies
Trucking industry in the United States
Manufacturing companies based in Minnesota
Companies based in Bloomington, Minnesota
Trane Technologies
1997 mergers and acquisitions